Conxita Julià i Farrés (11 June 1920 – 9 January 2019), also known as Conxita de Carrasco, was a Catalan woman noted for her dealings with Lluís Companys, President of Catalonia, in the 1930s, and for her poetry. Julià died in January 2019 at the age of 98.

The Companys handkerchief
In 1934, Lluís Companys, with the rest of the Catalan government, was imprisoned for his role in the political rebellion known as the "events of October the 6th". Initially they were held on the prison ship Uruguai in Barcelona, which the fourteen-year-old Conxita visited with her father to show their support. They were later moved to a prison in Cádiz in southern Spain. Conxita wrote to Companys in Cádiz, sending him a supportive poem called "Al meu aire". He replied to her, and they exchanged several more letters, hers in verse, during his imprisonment. In 1936, following his release by the new left-wing Spanish government, he returned to Barcelona and his old job as president of the Catalan autonomous government.

On 14 April that year Companys attended a ceremony at the grave of Francesc Macià in Montjuïc cemetery, where Conxita approached him and identified herself. Companys embraced her warmly, and when she asked him for a memento, he presented her with the white silk handkerchief from the breast pocket of his jacket, which was one of his famous symbols, exhorting her to "guard it, and love Catalonia". She brought the handkerchief home, and had a neighbour embroider it with the Catalan coat of arms and wording explaining the handkerchief's origin.

Later in 1936, the Spanish civil war broke out, which resulted in a victory for the Nationalists in 1939. Conxita's parents decided to burn everything the family had which might incriminate them, including Conxita's letters from Companys, who had now fled into exile. However, she managed to hide the handkerchief inside the lining of her coat, and carried it around with her from then on. In the following years, Conxita got married and started having children, still living in the Poblenou district of Barcelona, where she grew up. One day she received a warning that she was being monitored by local agents of the repressive authorities, so in fear of being found in its possession she sent the handkerchief away to Catalan acquaintances in Caracas in Venezuela, for safekeeping in the Catalan Centre in that city.

Following the end of Francoist Spain and the Spanish transition to democracy, she started making enquiries about getting the handkerchief back, and with the assistance of politicians Josep Benet i Morell and  secured its return and presented it to the Catalan government in 1993.

Monument
In April 1998, a memorial bronze-and-stone sculpture called A Lluís Companys ("to Lluís Companys") was unveiled in Barcelona, at the junction of Ronda de Sant Pere and Passeig de Sant Joan, near the Arc de Triomf. It was created by Spanish sculptor . Although it is named for Companys and the inscription only mentions Companys, its main feature is a two-metre-high figure of Conxita Julià at about 20 years old (her age at the time of Companys's execution), holding a handkerchief and a rose and leaning on a memorial plaque to Companys. On 15 October each year, the anniversary of Companys's execution, a floral tribute is laid at this monument, with Julià in attendance.

Poetry and other activities
She was also a keen hillwalker.

Published works
Silenci Sonor: Antología Poètica de Conxita Julià i Farrés (2004). 
Records de la meva infància: les passejades amb el pare (2007). Published by Barcelona City Council. Google Books

References

1920 births
2019 deaths
Catalan nationalists
Poets from Catalonia
El Poblenou
People from Barcelona
Spanish women poets